The Order of the Crown is the name of a number of decorations issued by several monarchies. The following nations either presently, or in the past, have issued Orders of the Crown:

Europe 
 Order of the Crown (Belgium)
 Order of the Crown of King Zvonimir (Croatia)
 Order of the Crown (France)
 Order of the Crown of Italy
 Order of the Iron Crown (Italy)
 Order of the Oak Crown (Luxemburg)
 Order of the Crown (Monaco)
 Order of the Crown (Netherlands)
 Order of the Crown (Romania)
 Order of the Yugoslav Crown

German and Austrian Empires
  Imperial Order of the Iron Crown (Austria)
 Order of the Rue Crown (Kingdom of Saxony)
 House Order of the Wendish Crown (House of Mecklenburg)
 Order of the Crown (Württemberg)
 Order of the Crown (Prussia)
 Order of the Crown of Westphalia

Other 
 Royal Family Order of the Crown of Brunei
 Order of the Crown of Brunei
 Order of the Crown of India
 Order of the Crown (Iran)
 Order of the Precious Crown (Japan)
 Order of the Crown of Johor
 Order of the Crown of the Realm (Malaysia)
 Order of Loyalty to the Crown of Malaysia
 Royal Order of the Crown (Rwanda)
 Order of the Crown (Tajikistan)
 Order of the Crown of Thailand
 Order of the Crown of Tonga

Orders of chivalry in Europe